This is a complete list of major generals in the United States Regular Army before July 1, 1920.

For most of the 19th and early 20th centuries, the rank of major general was the highest possible in the Regular Army. It was also one of the rarest: until 1915, there were at most eight major generals on active duty at any given time. Even when the Army expanded during times of war, the number of Regular Army major generals remained relatively constant because instead of increasing the permanent military establishment to meet transient wartime needs, the Regular Army was used as a cadre for a vast non-permanent establishment of volunteer and conscript forces. Many of the most famous major generals of the American Civil War held that rank only in the volunteer service, and reverted to a much lower permanent grade in the Regular Army when the volunteer force was disbanded after the war.

The number of Regular Army major generals increased dramatically when the Army was reorganized after World War I. The new peacetime establishment maintained a total of 34 active-duty major generals, including 21 major generals of the line and 13 major generals of the staff. The reorganization took effect on July 1, 1920.

Taxonomy
Historically, the United States Army included two components: the permanently established Regular Army, which constituted the peacetime force; and, during time of war, a much larger non-permanent establishment comprising various volunteer, conscript, and federalized state forces.

There were three types of major generals in the Regular Army:
 A major general of the line was an officer who was commissioned in the permanent grade of major general and therefore maintained that rank regardless of assignment.
 A major general of the staff was an officer who held the temporary rank of major general only while occupying an office designated by statute to carry that rank, and who reverted to a lower permanent grade upon relinquishing that office.
 An emergency major general was an officer whose Regular Army rank of major general was authorized only during the World War I emergency, which expired on June 30, 1920.

Major generals in the non-permanent or non-federal establishments included the following:
 A major general of militia was appointed or elected to that rank in one of the state militia forces.
 A major general of levies was appointed to that rank in the six-month levies raised during the Northwest Indian War.
 A major general of volunteers was appointed to that rank in the United States Volunteers during the War of 1812, the Mexican War, the Civil War, or the Spanish–American War.
 A major general in the Provisional Army was appointed to that rank in the Provisional Army authorized during the Quasi-War.
 A major general in the National Guard was appointed to that rank in one of the state National Guard forces.
 A major general in the National Army was appointed to that rank in the National Army during World War I before August 7, 1918, when the Regular Army, the National Army, and the federalized National Guard were unified into a single United States Army.
 A temporary major general was appointed to that rank in the non-permanent establishment of the unified United States Army after August 7, 1918.

In addition, honorary brevet ranks of major general were conferred in several organizations in recognition of gallant wartime conduct.
 A brevet major general was awarded that brevet rank in the Regular Army, typically for actions in the War of 1812, the Mexican War, or the Civil War.
 A brevet major general of volunteers was awarded that brevet rank in the United States Volunteers, typically for actions in the Civil War or the Spanish–American War.
 A brevet major general of militia was awarded that brevet rank in one of the state militia forces.

List of Regular Army major generals before July 1, 1920
The following list of major generals includes all officers appointed to that rank in the line or staff of the Regular Army prior to July 1, 1920, including emergency major generals. It does not include officers who held that rank solely by brevet or in the non-permanent or non-federal establishment, such as major generals of militia or volunteers, major generals in the National Guard or National Army, or temporary major generals.

Entries are indexed by the numerical order in which each officer was appointed to that rank while on active duty, or by an asterisk (*) if the officer did not serve in that rank while on active duty. Each entry lists the officer's name; date of rank; date the officer vacated the active-duty rank; number of years on active duty as major general (Yrs); and other biographical notes.

Timeline
By June 30, 1920, there were 10 major generals of the line (maj.gen. 1–10) and 10 major generals of the staff: the Quartermaster General (Q.m.Gen.), the Surgeon General (Surg.Gen.), the Chief of Coast Artillery (C.of C.A.), the Adjutant General (Adj.Gen.), the Inspector General (Insp.Gen.), the Judge Advocate General (J.A.G.), the Chief of Engineers (C.of Eng.), the Chief of Ordnance (C.of Ord.), the Chief Signal Officer (C.S.O.), and the Chief of the Bureau of Insular Affairs (C.of B.I.A.).

An officer held the permanent grade of major general (Maj.gen.) until his death; retirement; or promotion to a higher permanent grade such as lieutenant general (Lt.gen.), general (Gen.), or General of the Armies (Gen.Armies). Staff or brevet appointments to lieutenant general (Lt.gen.*) or general did not vacate the officer's permanent grade of major general; nor did appointments as major general of volunteers or in the National Army (vols.), or as emergency lieutenant general or general.

History

Northwest Indian War

The first major general in the Regular Army was Arthur St. Clair, who was appointed in 1791 to prosecute the Northwest Indian War. After the disastrous Battle of the Wabash, St. Clair was replaced by Anthony Wayne, who successfully concluded the war in 1795. Wayne died in December 1796 and the grade of major general was abolished three months later.

Quasi-War
After sixteen months in abeyance, the grade of major general was revived in 1798 when the Regular Army was expanded during the Quasi-War with France. As part of the buildup, Congress authorized a lieutenant general, two major generals, and an inspector general and a quartermaster general with the rank of major general. Only one of the two line major general slots was ultimately filled; the other was declined by Henry Knox, who refused to be outranked by the designated inspector general, Alexander Hamilton, who had been junior to Knox in the Continental Army during the American Revolutionary War. The President was also authorized to temporarily augment the Regular Army with a Provisional Army, but it was never fully organized. When tensions eased, the Provisional Army was disbanded and the maximum Regular Army rank was again reduced to brigadier general.

War of 1812

The grade of major general was revived permanently when the military establishment expanded in anticipation of the War of 1812. The first two major generals were Revolutionary War veterans Henry Dearborn and Thomas Pinckney. After a year of defeats, Dearborn was relieved and four more major generals were appointed: James Wilkinson, Wade Hampton, Morgan Lewis, and William Henry Harrison. A year later, all four had been court-martialled, sidelined, or driven to resign, and George Izard, Jacob J. Brown, and Andrew Jackson were promoted in their place.

After the war, the number of major generals was reduced to two, Brown and Jackson. In 1821 Congress eliminated the second major generalcy and Jackson departed the Army to become governor of Florida, leaving Brown to become the first Commanding General of the Army. When Brown died in 1828, the Army's two brigadier generals, Winfield Scott and Edmund P. Gaines, waged such a bitter public campaign for the vacant major generalcy that the President passed them both over in favor of Alexander Macomb. Macomb died in 1841 and was succeeded by Scott.

Mexican War
Scott remained the Army's senior officer during the Mexican War. After the outbreak of hostilities in 1846, Congress temporarily authorized a second major general on the condition that he be immediately discharged upon the ratification of a peace treaty, and the Army's three brigadier generals were passed over in favor of Zachary Taylor, victor at Palo Alto and Resaca de la Palma. Two more major generals were authorized the following year on the same basis, Gideon J. Pillow and John A. Quitman. After the war, the extra major generals were duly discharged and Scott again became the Army's only major general. Scott was breveted lieutenant general in 1855 but continued to occupy the substantive grade of major general until he retired in 1861.

Civil War

During the American Civil War, the bulk of the Union Army was composed of volunteer forces raised by individual states and led by dozens of federally appointed major generals of volunteers. The Regular Army itself was authorized a total of five major generals. Three of the new vacancies were filled immediately by former Regular Army officers George B. McClellan, John C. Frémont, and Henry W. Halleck, while Regular Army brigadier general John E. Wool was promoted for capturing Norfolk, Virginia, during the Peninsular Campaign. Subsequent appointments were reserved as prizes for major generals of volunteers who won decisive battlefield victories: Ulysses S. Grant for Vicksburg, William T. Sherman for Atlanta, George G. Meade for Spotsylvania, Philip H. Sheridan for Cedar Creek, and George H. Thomas for Nashville.

When the volunteers were disbanded after the war, its Regular Army officers reverted to their permanent grades. Many of the most famous Union Army major generals had been appointed to that rank only in the volunteer service and did not achieve the equivalent grade in the Regular Army until years or decades later, if ever. For example, upon mustering out of the volunteers in 1869, Oliver O. Howard reverted to his permanent Regular Army grade of brigadier general and had to wait until 1886 to again be promoted to major general; while George A. Custer never regained his wartime rank in the Regular Army and died as a lieutenant colonel. Of the dozens of major generals of volunteers who lost their temporary ranks after the Civil War, only nine ever attained the permanent grade of major general in the Regular Army before they retired.

Postwar

After the Civil War, promotions in the Regular Army virtually ceased due to the reduction in the size of the Army and the youth of its remaining officers. The postwar Army had only three major generalcies, which initially were held by officers whose rapid wartime promotions had advanced them to high command at such a young age that they could occupy the coveted grade for decades, obstructing further promotions. For example, John M. Schofield held his major generalcy for nearly 26 years, and Winfield S. Hancock for nearly twenty.

To unblock the promotion flow, Congress mandated in 1882 that officers must retire at age 64, but could retire sooner if they had at least forty years of service. Because officers nearing the age limit could now conveniently select their exit dates to coincide with vacancies in higher grades, it became common to fill each vacancy with a parade of aging veterans who would each be promoted and immediately retired with the higher rank and retired pay, as a reward for past service. In January 1904, for example, a single vacant major generalcy hosted five officers in five days, each of the first four in turn being promoted and then retired after only one day in grade to clear the way for the next. Congress blocked this practice in 1906 by requiring that general officers serve at least one year before being allowed to retire at that rank, except for age or disability.

Major generals of the staff

Officers in the Regular Army were classified either as line officers, who commanded combat formations, or staff officers, who performed specialized support functions. Permanent promotions to general officer grades were only available in the line. Staff officers could temporarily acquire the rank and pay of a general officer while detailed to certain offices designated by statute to carry that rank, such as chief of a staff bureau, but reverted to their permanent grades upon leaving such an office. Officers holding the permanent personal grade of general officer were called general officers of the line, while general officers holding only temporary ex-officio rank were called general officers of the staff.

For most of the 19th century, general officers of the staff were limited to the rank of brigadier general, but in 1900 the rank of the Adjutant General was temporarily increased to major general for the term of its then-incumbent, Henry C. Corbin. In 1904 Corbin transferred to a line command but retained the office of Adjutant General and its associated rank. In his absence, the Adjutant General's Department was merged with the Record and Pension Office into a consolidated bureau headed by Fred C. Ainsworth, who was appointed Military Secretary with the rank of major general. The Military Secretary was retitled Adjutant General after Corbin retired in 1906, and the office's rank reverted to brigadier general when Ainsworth was dismissed in 1912.

Major generals of the staff proliferated after 1912, when the Quartermaster Corps was created under a Quartermaster General bearing the temporary rank of major general. The Surgeon General reached that rank in 1915 when William C. Gorgas was appointed to that post and promoted to major general in the Medical Department to reward his service during the construction of the Panama Canal. The Chief of Coast Artillery became a major general of the staff in 1916. Finally, every other chief of a staff corps, department, or bureau was elevated to major general on October 6, 1917.

World War I

When the United States entered World War I in April 1917, the President was authorized to raise a temporary force of volunteers and conscripts, initially dubbed the National Army and later referred to as the non-permanent establishment of the United States Army after the Regular Army, National Army, and federalized National Guard were unified on August 7, 1918. Congress also granted authority to add an appropriate number of general officers to each organization "for the period of the existing emergency," which at first was used only for temporary appointments to major general and brigadier general in the National Army, but was later construed to allow emergency appointments to general and lieutenant general in the Regular Army. In July 1918 an emergency major general was authorized for service abroad as Assistant Surgeon General with the American Expeditionary Force; Merritte W. Ireland was appointed, followed by Robert E. Noble when Ireland became Surgeon General later that year. In contrast to the temporary general officers of the National Army or unified United States Army, emergency general officers were considered part of the permanent establishment. All emergency and temporary commissions expired with the wartime legislation on June 30, 1920.

After the war the Army was reorganized and the new peacetime establishment was authorized 21 major generals of the line, more than doubling the previous number, plus 13 major generals of the staff, including the newly created Chiefs of Infantry, Cavalry, and Field Artillery. The reorganization took effect on July 1, 1920.

Legislative history
The following list of Congressional legislation includes all acts of Congress directly pertaining to appointments to the grade of major general in the Regular Army. It does not include legislation pertaining solely to appointments to that grade in the non-permanent establishment, or by brevet.

Each entry lists an act of Congress, its citation in the United States Statutes at Large, the total number of active-duty major generals authorized subsequent to the act, the subsequent number of active-duty major generals of the line, the subsequent number of active-duty major generals of the staff, and a summary of the act's relevance.

See also

Major general (United States)
General officers in the United States
List of American Civil War generals
List of United States Army four-star generals
List of lieutenant generals in the United States Army before 1960
List of brigadier generals in the United States Regular Army before February 2, 1901

Notes

References

United States Regular Army before July 1, 1920, major generals
United States Regular Army before July 1, 1920, major generals
 
Regular Army major generals before July 1, 1920